Checkpoint is a 1956 British crime drama film directed by Ralph Thomas and starring Anthony Steel, Odile Versois, Stanley Baker, and James Robertson Justice.

Plot
O'Donovan breaks into a safe in a factory in Florence, Italy, late at night. That triggers a burglar alarm, and he shoots the night watchman and at least one policeman; his gunfire also starts a fire that consumes the factory. He goes to Francesca and demands she put him in contact with Petersen, her boss. Petersen hides O'Donovan at his villa.

In England, Warren Ingram tells Michael of his connection to the fiasco. Ingram, an industrial magnate, hired O'Donovan to lure away the designer for the Volta D'Italia car racing team, in hopes of making his team world champions. O'Donovan was unable to do that, so turned to industrial espionage, against Ingram's explicit orders not to do anything illegal, violent or risky. Ingram decides to smuggle O'Donovan out of the country, and Michael recommends driver Bill Fraser who needs money for a race car he has designed and is building.

The team board a flight to Italy, followed by Ingram and Michael. There, Fraser mends his strained romantic relationship with Francesca. Hiding at Petersen's villa, O'Donovan is displeased to hear that Ingram wants him to go to Bombay via Switzerland. O'Donovan tells Petersen to inform Ingram that he will sell the plans for the "fuel intake" Ingram wanted. At his team's garage, Ingram tells team manager Thornhill to team young driver Johnny Carpenter with his friend Fraser for the important upcoming race from Florence to Locarno. After sending Thornhill to the refueling stop at Milan, Ingram meets with O'Donovan and reluctantly buys the plans.

Between them, Petersen and his girlfriend Gabriela drug Johnny's drinks. Next day, Ingram calls Bill to Johnny's room, where Johnny is unconscious next to a whisky bottle. Since no last-minute driver changes are allowed, Ingram offers Bill financial backing for his race car in exchange for taking the risk of breaching the rules by substituting another co-driver for Johnny. Bill agrees.

On the day of the race, Francesca goes to Johnny's room to fetch him, but runs into O'Donovan and Petersen. Petersen holds Francesca captive while O'Donovan masquerades as Johnny. Ingram tells Francesca that if she notifies the authorities, Bill will go to prison. She is then released, though Ingram orders Petersen to follow her. She books a flight to Milan and breaks away from Petersen and gets aboard.

At the race-stop in Milan, Francesca warns Bill, but O'Donovan points his pistol at him, so Bill resumes the race. Francesca asks for Thornhill's help, and he drives her on a shortcut across the mountains to intercept Bill and O'Donovan without involving the police. Bill pulls over, complaining of a loose wheel or flat, and tries to overpower O'Donovan, but fails. O'Donovan orders Bill not to stop at the last checkpoint, even if they need to refuel to reach the finish line. Fearing for his life, Bill ignores O'Donovan's order to slow down, since O'Donovan cannot safely shoot him without endangering himself. Bill then deliberately takes a wrong turn, heading back from Switzerland towards Italy. Once O'Donovan realises what Bill is doing, he tries to grab the wheel. The car goes off the road and teeters on the edge of a cliff. The two men get out and fight, as Ingram, Francesca and the others converge on the scene. O'Donovan is knocked into the car, which then plunges over the cliff and into the lake. Ingram, struck by falling debris, makes a full confession to a frontier guard, taking full responsibility.

Cast
 Anthony Steel as Bill Fraser  
 Odile Versois as Francesca  
 Stanley Baker as O'Donovan  
 James Robertson Justice as Warren Ingram  
 Maurice Denham as Ted Thornhill  
 Michael Medwin as Ginger  
 Paul Muller as Petersen  
 Lee Patterson as Johnny Carpenter  
 Anne Heywood as Gabriela  
 Anthony Oliver as Michael  
 Philip Gilbert as Eddie  
 McDonald Hobley as Commentator
 Robert Rietty as Frontier Guard
 Andreas Malandrinos as Night Watchman
 Dino Galvani as Hotel Hall Porter

Production
It was the first in a new ten picture deal between the Rank Organisation and the team of Betty Box and Ralph Thomas.

Jeanne Crain was mentioned as a possibility for the female lead.

The film was shot at Pinewood Studios in London with location work in Italy, including footage of the Mille Miglia, and scenes at Lake Como. It was based on an original screenplay by Robert Estridge.

The movie features the Lotus Mark X Aston Martin. John Wyer and Roy Salvadori worked on the film as advisers. "Steel handled the car with surprising ease—and it isn't an easy thing to drive", said Wyer.

Anthony Steel married Anita Ekberg during the making of the film. It was one of the last movies he made for the Rank Organisation.

Reception
Variety called it "exciting entertainment".

Betty Box later wrote that the film "was for some reason or other an enormous success in Japan, and as the Japanese were crazy about the pale blue drivers' overalls, the fan letters we got from them weren't, as is usual, asking for autographs or photographs. They wanted to know where they could buy the overalls."

References

External links
 

Checkpoint at Britmovie
 
Review of film at The New York Times

1956 films
1956 crime drama films
British auto racing films
British crime drama films
Films set in Italy
Films shot at Pinewood Studios
1950s English-language films
Films directed by Ralph Thomas
1950s British films